is a 2009 console role-playing game, co-developed by Nippon Ichi Software, Idea Factory and Gust Corporation exclusively for the PlayStation 3. The game is published by Idea Factory in Japan and NIS America in North America and Europe and was released in Japan on October 1, 2009 and in North America and Europe in June 2010. The game features characters from the Atelier and Disgaea series from Gust Corporation and Nippon Ichi Software respectively, with fully 3D character models for the first time.

Characters

Original characters
 
These gems are capable of emitting energy that repels drifting objects in space, so as to prevent them from crashing into the Netheruniverse's capital, Empyria. He resists his fate during the ritual and becomes a Demon Dog King instead, his vassal Tsubaki frees him from his prison cell, and they both flee his family castle. He now lives a carefree life instead.
 
During her last mission to restore peace in the Netheruniverse, she decides to take action independent of the Goddess Union and starts an investigation about the drifting objects that travels towards Empyria. Prefers people to call her "Riz" (リゼリア Rizeria in the Japanese version).
 
Always behaving like a Yamato Nadeshiko, her true, scary nature slips out occasionally when she gets angry. No one knows of her secret ambitions.
 
He aims to usurp the throne to the Netheruniverse. Takes pride in his ahoge (lit. "fool's hair", an antenna-like hair that is a typical anime feature), and becomes mad and needlessly defensive whenever someone makes fun of it.
 
He is very passionate and friendly to his friends, but he has a complex over his name Recit because it sounds like 'receipt'. Designed by Kazuyuki Yoshizumi, character designer for Gust's Mana Khemia series.
 
She works very hard in order to send money to her poor family which lives on the other side of the universe. Cries easily in all kinds of situations, from being sad or happy, to confused or nervous. Designed by Yoshihiko Imaizumi, character designer for Nippon Ichi's Jigsaw World game.
 
She can sing, dance and assassinate, and is pretty famous in the Netheruniverse. Very positive and optimistic, but a little selfish. Her catchphrase is 'Are you prepared for your beautiful assassination?!' ("覚悟せよ♪" in the Japanese version, literally "get ready!").
 
A mystic that serves at Kanata's castle. Speaks with a feminine tone (an okama accent in the Japanese version), which sometimes conflicts with his appearance. Because of his household's and castle's economic deficits, he works several jobs such as being Mizuki's manager and an Innkeeper. He juggles these jobs with fighting with Kanata and Rizelea's party as well.

Nippon Ichi characters
  from Disgaea: Hour of Darkness
A witch girl traveling around the universe in a spaceship on a quest to fill the world with love. She is currently chasing Etna, who stole her spaceship.

  from Disgaea: Hour of Darkness
The pretty captain of a stolen ship, currently on a journey to find legendary sweets and conquer the world. The latter is her secondary goal.
  from Disgaea: Hour of Darkness
Etna's servants who toil solely for money, while continuing to work for Etna because they fear her as well. Frequently launched as cannonballs from the cannons in Etna's spaceship since they explode when thrown.

Gust characters
  from Atelier Viorate: Alchemist of Gramnad 2
As usual, she enjoys pulling pranks on people by suddenly appearing around them (especially the Prinnies and Lucius). Despite being a ghost, she is merry and cheerful all the time, though she often sounds flat or without any real opinion at all.
  from Atelier Viorate: Alchemist of Gramnad 2
A cheerful and active girl, Vio is very sociable and can make friends with anyone instantly. She creates a lot of things using materials from all over the Netheruniverse, as part of her alchemy training. She thinks that carrots are the ultimate ingredients in cooking. Her goals are to become a great alchemist and to make the best food using carrots as her main, if not only, ingredient. This also marks Violet's first appearance in the U.S. since the game she originates from was not localized (much like with Marie in Cross Edge).

Gameplay

In Trinity Universes battle system, each attack uses a certain amount of AP, and skills are assigned to three different buttons, it has a very similar combat system to Hyperdimension Neptunia except without Neptunias extensive customization. If players execute a string of skills, they can deal more damage. Time is said to be an important element, with players having a set period in which to destroy a gravitation field and escape a dungeon.

The game features two different scenarios, Goddess side which features Gust characters, and a Demon Lord side with Nippon Ichi characters. The protagonist in the Demon Lord story line is a devil dog named Kanata, while the Goddess side stars the Valkyrie Rizelea.

Reception

The game received "mixed" reviews according to the review aggregation website Metacritic.  In Japan, Famitsu gave it a score of one six, two eights, and one seven, for a total of 29 out of 40.

References

External links
Official Website 

2009 video games
Atelier (video game series)
Crossover role-playing video games
Disgaea
Japanese role-playing video games
Nippon Ichi Software games
PlayStation 3 games
PlayStation 3-only games
Science fantasy video games
Single-player video games
Video games developed in Japan
Video games set in castles
PhyreEngine games
Gust Corporation games
Video games about valkyries
Idea Factory games